The 2016–17 season was Watford's 136th year in existence and second consecutive season in the Premier League. Watford also participated in the FA Cup and League Cup. The season covers the period from 1 July 2016 to 30 June 2017.

Walter Mazzarri took over as manager following the departure of Quique Sánchez Flores.

Pre-season
In May 2016, Watford began to announce the pre-season friendlies.

Overview

{| class="wikitable" style="text-align: center"
|-
!rowspan=2|Competition
!colspan=8|Record
|-
!
!
!
!
!
!
!
!
|-
| Premier League

|-
| FA Cup

|-
| EFL Cup

|-
! Total

Competitions

Premier League

League table

Results summary

Results by matchday

Matches

FA Cup

EFL Cup

Staff

Squad information and statistics

Statistics correct as of 23 April 2017.

No. = Squad number

Pos = Playing position

P = Number of games played

G = Number of goals scored

 = Yellow cards

GK = Goalkeeper

DF = Defender

MF = Midfielder

FW = Forward

 = Red cards

Yth = Whether player went through Watford's youth system

Joined club = Year that player became a Watford first team player

Age = Current age

 Loan player

Non-playing staff

Information correct as of 11 July 2016.

Transfers

In

Out

Loans in

Loans out
Mathias Ranegie started the season on loan at Djurgårdens IF for the duration of the 2016 Allsvenskan season, having joined in February 2016.

References

Watford
Watford F.C. seasons